Natalya Akilova (born ) is a Kazakhstani volleyball player. She is a member of the Kazakhstan women's national volleyball team and played for Zhetyssu in 2011. 
She was part of the Kazakhstani national team at the 2011 FIVB World Grand Prix in Italy. 2014 FIVB World Grand Prix, 2017 FIVB World Grand Prix, and 2018 Asian Games.

Clubs 

  Zhetyssu (2011)

References

External links 

 FIVB profile
 Natalya Akilova Pictures in Zimbio

1993 births
Living people
People from Karaganda Region
Kazakhstani women's volleyball players
Place of birth missing (living people)
Volleyball players at the 2014 Asian Games
Volleyball players at the 2018 Asian Games
Asian Games competitors for Kazakhstan
21st-century Kazakhstani women